Garvida is a surname. Notable people with the surname include:

Jasper Garvida (born 1977), Filipino fashion designer
Jose Garvida Flores (1900–1944), Filipino poet and playwright